Jamilabad may refer to:
 Jamilabad, East Azerbaijan
 Jamilabad, Hamadan
 Jamilabad, Kerman

See also
 Jamalabad (disambiguation)